Lakshmi is a 2018 Indian Tamil-language musical dance film written and directed by A. L. Vijay. The film stars Ditya Bhande as the titular character along with Prabhu Deva and Aishwarya Rajesh in the lead roles alongside a supporting cast including Salman Yusuff Khan and Karunakaran. Produced by Prateek Chakravorty, Shruti Nallappa and R. Ravindran under the banner of Pramod Films and Trident Arts, the film features music composed by Sam C. S. and cinematography by Nirav Shah. The film released on 24 August 2018 on the eve of Varalakshmi Vratam and based on the theme of goddess Lakshmi.

Plot 
Ten-year-old Lakshmi lives and breathes "dance" and dreams of winning the "Pride of Life India Jr." title in the national level dance competition. However, her single mother Nandini detests music and dance. Soon, Lakshmi forms an unlikely bond with the people in a cafe near her school. Though Lakshmi approaches it for the music played in the store, she soon becomes a regular visitor. Vijay Krishna alias VK welcomes her when he becomes impressed by her moves, followed reluctantly by waiter Azhagu. Lakshmi gains VK's sympathy, and he accepts her request for him to help her achieve her dreams with VK posing as her father.

She soon enrolls herself in a dance academy with the help of VK that trains and selects students for the national-level competition. She befriends a lot of the students from the academy and soon gains a good name. Arjun, one of the students, is the son of the dance master Sofia. She soon makes it to the team that represents the academy.

On the day of selections, Lakshmi has cold feet and fails to perform due to stage fright, leading to her team's disqualification. In anger, her dance master Sofia (Arjun's mother) asks her to leave and never return. When VK learns of this, he comes to the selection arena and requests to give Lakshmi another chance. It is revealed that VK was a dancer who had participated in Pride of India in 2005 but could not make up to the finals due to an accident, which led him to a coma. The selections chief, Yusuf Khan, on seeing VK, accepts and makes him an offer that Lakshmi and her team could come on board the competition if he agrees to be the coach for the team with Sofia. Yusuf was often irritated with VK's popularity back in the Pride of India 2005, and his jealousy upon him may have been why he came up with this suggestion, as it gives him a chance to beat VK this time with his own dance team. Krishna agrees to be the coach and is able to help the team. In one of the rounds, the kids in Yusuf's team scatter the stage with pins before VK's team performs. Lakshmi and Arjun star together in the romantic dance but struggle greatly with the rest of their team, due to the pain from the sharp pins. They all manage to complete the dance but have bloodstains all over by the end of it. VK and Sophia seem to be the only ones who notice. They manage to make it to the final round, though in immense pain from the pins.

The opponents who scattered the pins feel guilty and ask for forgiveness. Later when VK's team was training for the final, Nandini comes to the practicing site. As Lakshmi participated without consent, she was angry. Then she meets VK and then it is revealed that VK was Nandini's ex-fiancé and Lakshmi's father. It was his over-dedication to dance that caused their separation. Angry Nandini then walks out of the place with Lakshmi forcefully. Lakshmi tries to return. This ends up in an accident where a vehicle carrying gas cylinders explodes.

Lakshmi is saved from further injuries by VK. However, Lakshmi is rushed to the hospital, where Nandini and VK learn that she has lost her hearing ability. She is not allowed to perform but asks VK why she cannot as it was her hearing she lost and not her legs. She surprises everybody by still arriving on the stage fully in costume, ready to dance. The audience is shocked at how she is able to dance without hearing the music. VK is seen standing in the middle, amongst the audience, mimicking the dance for her. When VK is restrained and unable to mimic the dance movements for Lakshmi, but is surprised to see Lakshmi still dancing. He then notices Yusuf counting the beats for her so she can still dance in time without hearing the music and the children in his team assisting the children in VK's team in holding back the men trying to stop VK from assisting Lakshmi in her dance. In the end, Lakshmi wins the "Pride of Life India Jr." title.

Cast

Production 
In September 2017, A. L. Vijay and Prabhu Deva began production work on a new film. Denying reports that it would be a sequel to Devi (2016), the film was launched in a ceremony on 22 September 2017 with Aishwarya Rajesh also revealed to be a part of the cast. Nirav Shah was signed as the cinematographer, while Sam C. S. and Anthony were signed as the music composer and editor respectively. The film was revealed to be a joint production by R. Ravindran of Trident Arts and Shruti Nallappa from Pramod Films, who had earlier secured Vijay's dates for the dropped proposed remake of the Malayalam film Charlie with Madhavan and Sai Pallavi. Described as a dance film for children, Prabhu Deva worked alongside child dancer Ditya Bhande, winner of the Hindi reality dance show Super Dancer, in the lead role. Other young dancers including Akshat Singh and Jeet Das, also worked on the film.

The shoot of the film was completed on 6 February 2018, with the producers gifting Prabhu Deva a large painting of himself. The film was partially re-shot in Telugu with Satyam Rajesh replacing Karunakaran.

Release 
Production budget of the film was valued at 12 crore. This movie was released on August 24, 2018. The satellite rights of the film were sold to Zee Tamil.

Soundtrack 

The soundtrack of the movie is composed by Sam CS of Vikram Vedha fame and all lyrics were written by Madhan Karky. The album consists of seven tracks, six of which are songs and one is a theme song. The music rights of the soundtrack album were acquired by the music label Muzik247.

See also
ABCD (franchise)

References

External links 

2010s children's drama films
2010s hip hop films
Indian dance films
Indian children's drama films
Films scored by Sam C. S.
Films directed by A. L. Vijay
2010s Tamil-language films